Oru Murai Sollividu is a 2004 Tamil-language romantic drama film directed by A. Jawahar. The film stars Rohit and Janapriya in lead roles with Yugendran and Radha Ravi in pivotal supporting roles. The film marks the film debut of Rohit and the Tamil film debut of Janapriya. This is Jawahar's second film after Maaran (2002).

Plot
Venkat (Rohit) is a college student and the son of a retired military official (Radha Ravi). He is in love with Dr. Priya (Janapriya). Priya tells him about her dark past and how her former lover fell off a balcony. Vankat's father arranges Venkat's marriage with another woman (Sushmita). Dr. Sundar is also in love with Priya, but it is a one-sided love.

Cast
Rohit as Venkat
Janapriya as Priya
Yugendran as Sundar
Radha Ravi as Venkat's father
 Sushmitha
Vadivelu as Harichandran
 S. S. Chandran
Gandhimathi
Singamuthu
Murthy

Production
Rohit, son of S. S. Chandran, made his film debut with this film. He had initially intended to make his debut through a film titled Royal Family in 2001, and then through Kolagalam in 2003, but neither film materialised. Sunitha Varma made her Tamil debut with this film under the name Janapriya.

Soundtrack
The soundtrack was composed by Bharadwaj, while lyrics written by Piraisoodan, Pa. Vijay, Snehan and Thamarai.

Reception
Sify gave the film a negative review and wrote that "Rohith has worked on his emotions, dance and fights but has a long way to go while Jana Priya looks pretty. Yogendran and Radha Ravi are ok while Vadivelu?s comedy is good. Jawahar?s second attempt at direction is not impressive and the film is missable". Chennai Online wrote that "So one does not go with any great expectations to view the film and if it turns out to be an also-ran, it's just what one expected".

Awards 
2004 Tamil Nadu State Film Awards
Best Male Character Artiste - Radha Ravi
Best Comedian - Gandhimathi

References

2004 films
Indian romantic drama films
2000s Tamil-language films
Films scored by Bharadwaj (composer)
2004 romantic drama films